Carol E. Jackson (born 1952) is a former United States district judge of the United States District Court for the Eastern District of Missouri.

Education and career

Born in St. Louis, Missouri, Jackson received a Bachelor of Arts degree from Wellesley College in 1973 followed by a Juris Doctor from the University of Michigan Law School in 1976. She was in private practice in St. Louis from 1976 to 1983, and was then a senior attorney of Mallinckrodt, Inc., in St. Louis, from 1983 to 1985. She was an adjunct professor at the School of Law at Washington University in St. Louis from 1989 to 1992.

Federal judicial service

Jackson served as a United States magistrate judge of the United States District Court for the Eastern District of Missouri from 1986 to 1992.  She was the first African-American magistrate judge in the Eastern District of Missouri.

On April 1, 1992, Jackson was nominated by President George H. W. Bush to a seat on the United States District Court for the Eastern District of Missouri vacated by Judge William L. Hungate. She was confirmed by the United States Senate on August 12, 1992, and received her commission on August 17, 1992. She became the first African-American woman to serve as a district court judge in the Eastern District of Missouri. She served as Chief Judge from 2002 through 2009 as the first African-American chief judge. She retired from active service on August 31, 2017.

See also 
 List of African-American federal judges
 List of African-American jurists
 List of first women lawyers and judges in Missouri

References

Sources
 

1952 births
Living people
Judges of the United States District Court for the Eastern District of Missouri
United States district court judges appointed by George H. W. Bush
20th-century American judges
African-American judges
Wellesley College alumni
University of Michigan Law School alumni
United States magistrate judges
20th-century American women judges
Washington University in St. Louis faculty